The Copa Chile 1996 was the 26th edition of the Chilean Cup tournament. The competition started on February 17, 1996, and concluded on November 30, 1996. Colo-Colo won the competition for their tenth time, beating Rangers in the finals.

Calendar

Group Round

Group 1A

Group 2A

Group 3A

Group 4A

Group 1B

Group 2B

Group 3B

Group 4B

Quarterfinals

|}

Semifinals

Finals

Top goalscorers

See also
 1996 Campeonato Nacional
 Primera B

References
Revista Don Balon (Santiago, Chile) February–November 1996 (scores & information)
RSSSF (secondary source)

Copa Chile
Chile
1996